Diego Hofland (born 21 September 1990) is a Dutch born German professional ice hockey forward currently playing for the Tilburg Trappers in the Oberliga.

From 2009 through 2013 he played for Düsseldorfer EG, formerly known as DEG Metro Stars, of the DEL. He also played for EV Duisburg and the Iserlohn Roosters.

References

External links
 

1990 births
Dutch ice hockey forwards
DEG Metro Stars players
Düsseldorfer EG players
Füchse Duisburg players
Iserlohn Roosters players
Krefeld Pinguine players
Living people
Rote Teufel Bad Nauheim players
Sportspeople from Rotterdam
Dutch expatriate sportspeople in Germany